Oakland Cemetery is located on the north side of Iowa City, Iowa, and has served as the main cemetery for Iowa City since 1843.

Cemetery history
Oakland Cemetery was deeded to the residents of Iowa City on February 13, 1843. Supported by taxpayers, the cemetery is a non-perpetual care facility. As a public institution anyone can be buried in Oakland, but traditionally it was a Protestant cemetery; Catholics were usually buried in the nearby St. Joseph Cemetery, and Jewish Iowa Citians were buried at Agudas Achim Cemetery. Oakland is adjacent to Hickory Hill Park, a large natural area in Iowa City.

Black Angel

The story of the Black Angel dates back to the late 19th century when Teresa Feldevert traveled to Iowa City from an area that is now known as the Czech Republic and Slovakia. Her first marriage produced her son, Edward Dolezal, who died in Iowa City in 1891. Teresa had the bronze angel statue made in Chicago by Czech-American sculptor Mario Korbel and transported to Iowa City to be placed in the cemetery in 1915. Her second husband, Nicholas Feldevert’s ashes were placed in a repository at the base of the statue. When Teresa died in 1924, her ashes were placed beside her husband’s. Though the monument displays Teresa’s birthdate, there is no sign of her death date. Over the years the bronze statue oxidized, acquiring a greenish-black patina.

Many students and surrounding residents of Iowa City visit the statue. The biggest night of attraction is Halloween where students and residents gather around the statue, some test their luck by touching or kissing the statue. It is said that if one touches or kisses the statue they will be struck dead unless that person is a virgin. It is also rumored that if a pregnant woman walks beneath the statue’s stretched wings that she will miscarry. Vandals have damaged the statue, removing several fingers.

The Black Angel appears in W.P. Kinsella's 1986 novel The Iowa Baseball Confederacy, where the statue plays right field for the Confederacy.

In 2013, the Black Angel was planned to be featured in an independent paranormal feature film. Footage of the Black Angel is included in the music video for "Alive Twice" by the band Friendship.

Notable graves
 Isaac Augustus Wetherby, American painter and photographer
 Robert Lucas, Governor of Ohio and First Territorial Governor of Iowa
 Samuel J. Kirkwood, Civil War Governor of Iowa and U.S. Senator
 Eleanor Hoyt Brainerd, novelist
 Virgil M. Hancher, 13th President of the University of Iowa
 Irving Weber, Iowa City historian
 Mauricio Lasansky, artist
 Abel Beach, poet and a founder of the international fraternity Theta Delta Chi
 Bobbie Battista, CNN anchor and journalist

Notes

External links
 

Cemeteries in Iowa
Iowa City, Iowa
Protected areas of Johnson County, Iowa
Tourist attractions in Iowa City, Iowa